The 2010 NHL Entry Draft was the 48th NHL Entry Draft, held on June 25–26, 2010 at Staples Center in Los Angeles, California, home arena of the Los Angeles Kings. This was the first time Los Angeles hosted the NHL Entry Draft. An unofficial record of eleven American-trained players were selected in the first round, starting with Jack Campbell and ending with Brock Nelson. The record was set in the 2006 and 2007 drafts, where ten U.S.-trained players were selected in the first round.

Top prospects 

Source: NHL Central Scouting Bureau final rankings.

Draft Lottery
The 2010 NHL Entry Draft Lottery was held on April 13, 2010. The lottery saw no change from the overall NHL standings to end the 2009–10 NHL season. For the fourth time in five years, the 30th placed team, this year being the Edmonton Oilers, has kept the first overall draft pick.

Selections by round

Round one

Notes
 The Toronto Maple Leafs' first-round pick went to the Boston Bruins as the result of a trade on September 18, 2009 that sent Phil Kessel to Toronto in exchange for Toronto's first-round pick in 2011, Toronto's second-round pick in 2010 and this pick.
The Calgary Flames' first-round pick went to the Phoenix Coyotes as the result of a trade on March 4, 2009 that sent Olli Jokinen and Phoenix's third-round pick in 2009 to Calgary for Matthew Lombardi, Brandon Prust and this pick (being conditional at the time of the trade). The condition – Calgary had the option to give their first-round pick to Phoenix either in 2009 or 2010 – was converted on June 1, 2009 when Calgary decided to keep their first-round pick in 2009.
 The Boston Bruins' first-round pick went to the Los Angeles Kings as the result of a trade on June 25, 2010 that sent Los Angeles' first-round pick (19th overall) and Philadelphia's second-round pick (59th overall) both in 2010 to Florida in exchange for this pick.
Florida previously acquired the pick as the result of a trade on June 22, 2010 that sent Nathan Horton and Gregory Campbell to Boston in exchange for Dennis Wideman, Boston's third-round pick in 2011 and this pick.
 The Ottawa Senators' first-round pick went to the St. Louis Blues as the result of a trade on June 25, 2010 that sent David Rundblad to Ottawa in exchange for this pick.
 The Los Angeles Kings' first-round pick went to the Florida Panthers as the result of a trade on June 25, 2010 that sent Boston's first-round pick in 2010 (15th overall) to Los Angeles in exchange for Philadelphia's second-round pick in 2010 (59th overall) and this pick.
 The Phoenix Coyotes' first-round pick went to the Montreal Canadiens as the result of a trade on June 25, 2010 that sent Montreal's first and second-round picks both in 2010 (27th and 57th overall) to Phoenix in exchange for Buffalo's fourth-round pick in 2010 (113th overall) and this pick.
 The New Jersey Devils' first-round pick went to the Chicago Blackhawks as the result of a trade on June 24, 2010 that sent Dustin Byfuglien, Ben Eager, Brent Sopel and Akim Aliu to Atlanta in exchange for Marty Reasoner, Joey Crabb, Jeremy Morin, New Jersey's second-round pick in 2010 and this pick.
Atlanta previously acquired the pick as the result of a trade on February 4, 2010 that sent Ilya Kovalchuk, Anssi Salmela and Atlanta's second-round pick in 2010 to New Jersey in exchange for Niclas Bergfors, Johnny Oduya, Patrice Cormier, New Jersey's second-round pick in 2010 and this pick.
 The Vancouver Canucks' first-round pick went to the Florida Panthers as the result of a trade on June 25, 2010 that sent Keith Ballard and Victor Oreskovich to Vancouver in exchange for Steve Bernier, Michael Grabner and this pick.
 The Montreal Canadiens' first-round pick went to the Phoenix Coyotes as the result of a trade on June 25, 2010 that sent Phoenix's first-round pick and Buffalo's fourth-round pick both in 2010 (22nd and 113th overall) to Montreal in exchange for Montreal's second-round pick in 2010 (57th overall) and this pick.
 The Philadelphia Flyers' first-round pick went to the Anaheim Ducks as the result of a trade on June 26, 2009 that sent Chris Pronger and Ryan Dingle to Philadelphia in exchange for Joffrey Lupul, Luca Sbisa, Philadelphia's first-round pick in 2009, a conditional third-round pick in either 2010 or 2011 and this pick.
 The Chicago Blackhawks' first-round pick went to the New York Islanders as the result of a trade on June 25, 2010 that sent the Islanders and San Jose's second round picks in 2010 (35th and 58th overall) to Chicago in exchange for this pick.

Round two

Notes
 The Toronto Maple Leafs' second-round pick went to the Boston Bruins as the result of a trade on September 18, 2009 that sent Phil Kessel to Toronto in exchange for Toronto's first-round picks in 2010 and 2011 and this pick.
Toronto previously re-acquired their own second-round pick as the result of a trade on September 5, 2009 that sent Calgary's second-round pick in 2011 and Toronto's own third-round pick in 2011 to Chicago in exchange for this pick.
Chicago previously acquired the pick as the result of a trade on September 12, 2008 that sent Robert Lang to Montreal in exchange for this pick.
Montreal previously acquired the pick as the result of a trade on July 3, 2008 that sent Mikhail Grabovski to Toronto in exchange for Greg Pateryn and this pick.
 The New York Islanders' second-round pick went to the Chicago Blackhawks as the result of a trade on June 25, 2010 that sent Chicago's first-round pick in 2010 (30th overall) to New York in exchange for San Jose's second-round pick in 2010 (58th overall) and this pick.
 The Tampa Bay Lightning's second-round pick went to the Florida Panthers as the result of a trade on March 3, 2010 that sent Dennis Seidenberg and Matt Bartkowski to Boston in exchange for Craig Weller, Byron Bitz and this pick.
Boston previously acquired the pick as the result of a trade on March 4, 2009 that sent Matt Lashoff and Martins Karsums to Tampa Bay in exchange for Mark Recchi and this pick.
 The Atlanta Thrashers' second-round pick went to the New Jersey Devils as the result of a trade on February 4, 2010 that sent Niclas Bergfors, Johnny Oduya, Patrice Cormier, New Jersey's first and second-round picks in 2010 to Atlanta in exchange for Ilya Kovalchuk, Anssi Salmela and this pick.
 The Calgary Flames' second-round pick went to the Toronto Maple Leafs as the result of a trade on June 26, 2010 that sent Jimmy Hayes to Chicago in exchange for this pick.
Chicago previously acquired the pick as the result of a trade on July 1, 2008 that sent Rene Bourque to Calgary in exchange for this pick (being conditional at the time of the trade). The condition – Calgary chooses to trade a pick in either 2009 or 2010 – was converted on March 4, 2009 when Calgary traded their second-round pick in 2009 to Colorado.
 The Ottawa Senators' second-round pick went to the Edmonton Oilers as the result of a trade on June 26, 2010 that sent the rights to Riley Nash to the Carolina Hurricanes in exchange for this pick.
Carolina previously acquired the pick as the result of a trade on February 12, 2010 that sent Matt Cullen to Ottawa in exchange for Alexandre Picard and this pick.
 The Colorado Avalanche's second-round pick went to the Los Angeles Kings as the result of a trade on June 26, 2010 that sent Los Angeles' second and fourth-round picks in 2010 (49th and 109th overall) to Colorado in exchange for this pick.
 The Nashville Predators' second-round pick went to the Edmonton Oilers as the result of a trade on March 1, 2010 that sent Denis Grebeshkov to Nashville in exchange for this pick.
 The Los Angeles Kings' second-round pick went to the Colorado Avalanche as the result of a trade on June 26, 2010 that sent Colorado's second-round pick in 2010 (47th overall) to Los Angeles in exchange for the Kings' fourth-round pick in 2010 (109th overall) and this pick.
 The Pittsburgh Penguins' second-round pick went to the Florida Panthers as the result of a trade on March 1, 2010 that sent Jordan Leopold to Pittsburgh in exchange for this pick.
 The Buffalo Sabres' second-round pick went to the Carolina Hurricanes as the result of a trade on February 7, 2010 that sent Niclas Wallin and Carolina's fifth-round pick in 2010 to San Jose in exchange for this pick.
San Jose previously acquired the pick as the result of a trade on July 4, 2008 that sent Craig Rivet and San Jose's seventh-round pick in 2010 to Buffalo in exchange for Buffalo's second-round pick in 2009 and this pick.
 The New Jersey Devils' second-round pick went to the Chicago Blackhawks as the result of a trade on June 24, 2010 that sent Dustin Byfuglien, Ben Eager, Brent Sopel and Akim Aliu to Atlanta in exchange for Marty Reasoner, Joey Crabb, Jeremy Morin, New Jersey's first-round pick in 2010 and this pick.
Atlanta previously acquired this pick as the result of a trade on February 4, 2010 that sent Ilya Kovalchuk, Anssi Salmela and Atlanta's second-round pick in 2010 to New Jersey in exchange for Niclas Bergfors, Johnny Oduya, Patrice Cormier, New Jersey's first-round pick in 2010 and this pick.
 The Vancouver Canucks' second-round pick went to the Columbus Blue Jackets as the result of a trade on March 3, 2010 that sent Raffi Torres to Buffalo in exchange for Nathan Paetsch and this pick.
Buffalo previously acquired the pick as the result of a trade on July 4, 2008 that sent Steve Bernier to Vancouver in exchange for Los Angeles' third-round pick in 2009 and this pick.
 The Washington Capitals' second-round pick went to the Minnesota Wild as the result of a trade on March 3, 2010 that sent Eric Belanger to Washington in exchange for this pick.
 The Montreal Canadiens' second-round pick went to the Phoenix Coyotes as the result of a trade on June 25, 2010 that sent Phoenix's first-round pick and Buffalo's fourth-round pick both in 2010 (22nd and 113th overall) to Montreal in exchange for Montreal's first-round pick in 2010 (27th overall) and this pick.
 The San Jose Sharks' second-round pick went to the Chicago Blackhawks as the result of a trade on June 25, 2010 that sent Chicago's first-round pick in 2010 (30th overall) to the New York Islanders in exchange for the Islanders' second-round pick in 2010 (35th overall) and this pick.
The Islanders previously acquired the pick as the result of a trade on March 2, 2010 that sent Andy Sutton to Ottawa in exchange for this pick.
Ottawa previously acquired the pick in a trade on September 12, 2009 that sent Dany Heatley and Ottawa's fifth-round pick in 2010 to San Jose in exchange for Milan Michalek, Jonathan Cheechoo and this pick.
 The Philadelphia Flyers' second-round pick went to the Minnesota Wild as the result of a trade on June 26, 2010 that send Minnesota's third and fourth-round picks both in 2010 (69th and 99th overall) to Florida in exchange for this pick.
Florida previously acquired the pick as the result of a trade on June 25, 2010 that sent Boston's first-round pick in 2010 (15th overall) to Los Angeles in exchange for the Kings' first-round pick in 2010 (19th overall) and this pick.
Los Angeles previously acquired the pick as the result of a trade on July 1, 2008 that sent Patrik Hersley and Ned Lukacevic to Philadelphia in exchange for Denis Gauthier and this pick.

Round three

Notes
 The Florida Panthers' third-round pick went to the Tampa Bay Lightning as the result of a trade on March 3, 2010 that sent Jeff Halpern to the Los Angeles Kings in exchange for Teddy Purcell and this pick.
Los Angeles previously acquired the pick as the result of a trade on June 27, 2009 that sent a fourth-round pick (#107 overall) in 2009 and a fifth-round pick (#138 overall) in 2009 to Florida in exchange for this pick.
 The Columbus Blue Jackets' third-round pick went to the Calgary Flames as the result of a trade on September 28, 2009 that sent Anton Stralman to Columbus in exchange for this pick.
 The Atlanta Thrashers' third-round pick went to the Buffalo Sabres as the result of a trade on March 3, 2010 that sent Clarke MacArthur to Atlanta in exchange for a fourth-round pick in 2010 and this pick.
 The Minnesota Wild's third round pick went to the Florida Panthers as the result of a trade on June 26, 2010 that send a second-round pick (59th overall) to Minnesota in exchange for a fourth-round pick (99th overall) and this pick.
 The New York Rangers' third-round pick went to the Los Angeles Kings as the result of a trade on June 27, 2009 that sent Brian Boyle to New York in exchange for this pick.
 The Dallas Stars' third-round pick (71st overall) went to the Colorado Avalanche as the result of a trade on June 26, 2010 that sent a third-round pick (77th overall) and a fourth-round pick (109th overall) to Dallas.
 The Anaheim Ducks' third-round pick went to the Tampa Bay Lightning as the result of a trade on August 13, 2009 that sent Evgeny Artyukhin to Anaheim in exchange for Drew Miller and this pick.
 The Boston Bruins' third-round pick went to the Buffalo Sabres as the result of a trade on October 20, 2009 that sent Daniel Paille to Boston in exchange for a conditional fourth-round pick in 2010 and this pick.
 The Colorado Avalanche's third-round pick went to the Dallas Stars as the result of a trade on June 26, 2010 that send a third-round pick (71st overall) to Colorado in exchange for a fourth-round pick (109th overall) and this pick.
 The Los Angeles Kings' third-round pick went to the Toronto Maple Leafs as the result of a trade on June 26, 2010 that send a third-round pick in 2012 to Los Angeles in exchange for this pick.
 The Phoenix Coyotes' third-round pick went to the New York Islanders as the result of a trade on June 27, 2009 that sent a third-round pick (#62 overall) in 2009 to Phoenix in exchange for this pick.
 The Vancouver Canucks' third-round pick went to the Carolina Hurricanes as the result of a March 3, 2010 trade that sent Andrew Alberts to the Canucks in exchange for this pick.
 The Montreal Canadiens' third-round pick went to the Atlanta Thrashers as the result of a trade on February 16, 2009 that sent Mathieu Schneider to Montreal in exchange for Anaheim's second-round pick in 2009 and this pick.

Round four

Notes
 The Toronto Maple Leafs' fourth-round pick went to the Florida Panthers as the result of a trade on September 2, 2008 that sent Mike Van Ryn to Toronto in exchange for Bryan McCabe and this pick.
 The New York Islanders' fourth-round pick went to the Colorado Avalanche as the result of a trade on June 26, 2010 that send a third-round pick in 2011 to Colorado in exchange for this pick.
 The Carolina Hurricanes' fourth-round pick went to the Boston Bruins as the result of a trade on July 24, 2009 that sent Aaron Ward to Carolina in exchange for Patrick Eaves and this pick.
 The Atlanta Thrashers' fourth-round pick went to the Buffalo Sabres as the result of a trade on March 3, 2010 that sent Clarke MacArthur to Atlanta in exchange for a third-round pick in 2010 and this pick.
 The Minnesota Wild's fourth-round pick went to the Florida Panthers as the result of a trade on June 26, 2010 that send a second-round pick (59th overall) to Minnesota in exchange for a third-round pick (69th overall) and this pick.
 The Dallas Stars' fourth-round pick went to the Atlanta Thrashers as the result of a trade on February 9, 2010 that sent Kari Lehtonen to Dallas in exchange for Ivan Vishnevskiy and this pick.
 The Anaheim Ducks' fourth-round pick went to the Columbus Blue Jackets as the result of a trade on July 15, 2008 that sent Joakim Lindstrom to Anaheim in exchange for this pick (being conditional at the time of the trade). The condition – Lindstrom appears in more than 40 regular season or 15 playoff games with Anaheim or another team during the 2008–09 season – was converted on April 1, 2009.
 The Boston Bruins' fourth-round pick went to the Carolina Hurricanes as the result of a trade on March 3, 2010 that sent Aaron Ward to Anaheim in exchange for Justin Pogge and this pick (being conditional at the time of the trade). The condition – Boston does not trade this pick prior to the draft – was converted.
Anaheim previously acquired this pick as the result of a trade on March 2, 2010 that sent Steven Kampfer to Boston in exchange for this conditional pick.
 The Nashville Predators' fourth-round pick went to the Calgary Flames as the result of a trade on March 3, 2010 that sent Dustin Boyd to the Predators in exchange for this pick.
 The Los Angeles Kings' fourth-round pick went to the Dallas Stars as the result of a trade on June 26, 2010 that sent a third-round pick (71st overall) to the Colorado Avalanche in exchange for a third-round pick (77th overall) and this pick.
Colorado previously acquired the pick as the result of a trade on June 26, 2010 that sent a second-round pick (47th overall) to Los Angeles in exchange for a second-round pick (49th overall) and this pick.
 The Phoenix Coyotes' fourth-round pick went to the Washington Capitals as the result of a trade on June 26, 2010 that sent a fourth-round pick (116th overall) and a fifth-round pick (146th overall) to the Toronto Maple Leafs in exchange for this pick.
Toronto previously acquired the pick as the result of a trade on March 3, 2010 that sent Lee Stempniak to Phoenix in exchange for Matt Jones, the Coyotes' seventh-round pick in 2010, and this pick.
 The Buffalo Sabres' first-round pick went to the Montreal Canadiens as the result of a trade on June 25, 2010 that sent a first-round pick (27th overall) and a second-round pick (57th overall) to the Phoenix Coyotes in exchange for a first-round pick (22nd overall) and this pick.
Phoenix previously acquired this pick as the result of a trade on March 4, 2009 that sent Mikael Tellqvist to Buffalo in exchange for this pick.
The Washington Capitals' fourth-round pick went to the Toronto Maple Leafs as the result of a trade on June 26, 2010 that sent a fourth-round pick (112th overall) to Washington in exchange for a fifth-round pick (146th overall) and this pick.
 The San Jose Sharks' fourth-round pick went to the Tampa Bay Lightning as the result of a trade on July 4, 2008 that sent Dan Boyle and Brad Lukowich to San Jose in exchange for Matt Carle, Ty Wishart, a first-round pick in 2009 and this pick.

Round five

Notes
 The Toronto Maple Leafs' fifth-round pick went to the Anaheim Ducks as the result of a trade on June 26, 2010 that sent Mike Brown to Toronto in exchange for this pick.
 The Tampa Bay Lightning's fifth-round pick went to the Nashville Predators as the result of a trade on June 27, 2009 that sent a fifth-round pick (#148 overall) in 2009 to Tampa Bay in exchange for this pick.
 The Carolina Hurricanes' fifth-round pick went to the San Jose Sharks as the result of a trade on February 7, 2010 that sent Buffalo's second-round pick in 2010 to Carolina in exchange for Niclas Wallin and this pick.
 The Minnesota Wild's fifth-round pick went to the San Jose Sharks as the result of a trade on June 21, 2010 that sent Brad Staubitz to Minnesota in exchange for this pick.
 The Ottawa Senators' fifth-round pick went to the San Jose Sharks as the result of a trade on September 12, 2009 that sent Milan Michalek, Jonathan Cheechoo and a second-round pick in 2010 to Ottawa in exchange for Dany Heatley and this pick.
 The Los Angeles Kings' fifth-round pick went to the Colorado Avalanche as the result of a trade on July 3, 2009 that sent Ryan Smyth to Los Angeles in exchange for Tom Preissing, Kyle Quincey and this pick.
 The Nashville Predators' fifth-round pick went to the Phoenix Coyotes as a result of a trade on May 13, 2010 that sent Jared Staal to Carolina in exchange for this pick.
Carolina previously acquired this pick as the result of a trade on June 19, 2008 that sent a fifth-round pick in 2009 to Nashville in exchange for Darcy Hordichuk and this pick (being conditional at the time of the trade). The condition – Hordichuk is not signed by Carolina prior to the 2008–09 season – was converted on July 1, 2008 when the player was signed by the Vancouver Canucks.
 The Phoenix Coyotes' fifth-round pick went to the Washington Capitals as the result of a trade on June 27, 2009 that sent Sami Lepisto to Phoenix in exchange for this pick.
 The New Jersey Devils' fifth-round pick went to the Toronto Maple Leafs as the result of a trade on March 3, 2010 that sent Martin Skoula to the Devils in exchange for this pick.
 The Washington Capitals' fifth-round pick went to the Toronto Maple Leafs as the result of a trade on June 26, 2010 that sent a fourth-round pick (112th overall) to Washington in exchange for a fourth-round pick (116th overall) and this pick.
 The San Jose Sharks' fifth-round pick went to the Los Angeles Kings as the result of a trade on June 21, 2008 that sent a fourth-round pick in 2008 to San Jose in exchange for a fourth-round pick in 2009 and this pick.
 The Chicago Blackhawks' fifth-round pick went to the Atlanta Thrashers as the result of a trade on June 27, 2009 that sent a sixth-round pick (#177 overall) in 2009 to Chicago in exchange for this pick.

Round six

Notes
 The Edmonton Oilers' sixth-round pick went to the Chicago Blackhawks as the result of a trade on June 24, 2010 that send Colin Fraser to Edmonton in exchange for this pick.
 The Toronto Maple Leafs' sixth-round pick went to the Pittsburgh Penguins as the result of a trade on March 3, 2010 that sent Chris Peluso to the Maple Leafs in exchange for this pick.
 The New York Islanders' sixth-round pick went to the Atlanta Thrashers as the result of a trade on June 26, 2010 that sent a fifth-round pick in 2011 to New York in exchange for a sixth-round pick (160th overall) and this pick.
 The Carolina Hurricanes' sixth-round pick went to the New York Rangers as the result of a trade on June 26, 2010 that sent Bobby Sanguinetti to Carolina in exchange for a second-round pick in 2011 and this pick.
 The Atlanta Thrashers' sixth-round pick went to the Los Angeles Kings as the result of a trade on June 26, 2010 that sent a sixth-round pick (169th overall) and a seventh-round pick (199th overall) to Los Angeles in exchange for this pick.
 The New York Rangers' sixth-round pick went to the Atlanta Thrashers as the result of a trade on June 26, 2010 that sent a fifth-round pick in 2011 to the New York Islanders in exchange for a sixth-round pick (155th overall) and this pick.
The Islanders previously acquired the pick as the result of a trade on May 25, 2010 that sent Jyri Niemi to the NY Rangers in exchange for this pick.
 The Dallas Stars' sixth-round pick went to the Anaheim Ducks as the result of a trade on December 14, 2008 that sent Brian Sutherby to Dallas in exchange for David McIntyre and this pick (being conditional at the time of the trade). The converted condition attached to this pick is unknown.
 The Anaheim Ducks' sixth-round pick went to the Edmonton Oilers as the result of a trade on March 3, 2010 that sent Lubomir Visnovsky to Anaheim in exchange for Ryan Whitney and this pick.
 The Calgary Flames' sixth-round pick went to the San Jose Sharks as the result of a trade on June 26, 2010 that sent Henrik Karlsson to Calgary in exchange for this pick.
 The Ottawa Senators' sixth-round pick went to the Edmonton Oilers as the result of a trade on June 27, 2009 that sent a seventh-round pick (#191 overall) in 2009 to Ottawa in exchange for this pick.
 The Colorado Avalanche's sixth-round pick went to the Carolina Hurricanes as the result of a March 3, 2010 trade that sent Stephane Yelle and Harrison Reed to the Avalanche in exchange for Cedric McNicoll and this pick.
 The Los Angeles Kings' sixth-round pick went to the Atlanta Thrashers as the result of a trade on June 26, 2010 that sent a sixth-round pick (158th overall) to Los Angeles in exchange for a seventh-round pick (199th overall) and this pick.
 The Phoenix Coyotes' sixth-round pick went to the Vancouver Canucks as the result of a trade on March 3, 2010 that sent Mathieu Schneider to Phoenix in exchange for Sean Zimmerman and this pick (being conditional at the time of the trade). The condition – Schneider successfully clears re-entry waivers – was converted.
 The Montreal Canadiens' sixth-round pick went to the Anaheim Ducks as the result of a trade on May 28, 2010 that sent Mattias Modig to Pittsburgh in exchange for this pick.
Pittsburgh previously acquired the pick as the result of a trade on June 27, 2009 that sent a seventh-round pick (#211 overall) in 2009 to Montreal in exchange for this pick.
 The San Jose Sharks' sixth-round pick went to the Ottawa Senators as the result of a trade on July 8, 2009 that sent Alex Auld to Dallas in exchange for this pick.
Dallas previously acquired the pick as the result of a trade on June 27, 2009 that sent a seventh-round pick (#189 overall) in 2009 to San Jose in exchange for this pick.

Round seven

Notes
 The Atlanta Thrashers' seventh-round pick went to the San Jose Sharks as the result of a trade on June 23, 2010 that sent Michael Vernace, Brett Sterling and this pick to San Jose in exchange for future considerations.
 The Dallas Stars' seventh-round pick went to the Chicago Blackhawks as the result of a trade on October 8, 2008 that sent Doug Janik to Dallas in exchange for this pick (being conditional at the time of the trade). The converted condition attached to this pick is unknown.
 The St. Louis Blues' seventh-round pick went to the Nashville Predators as the result of a trade on June 27, 2009 that sent a seventh-round pick (#202 overall) in 2009 to Nashville in exchange for this pick.
 The Los Angeles Kings' seventh-round pick went to the Atlanta Thrashers as the result of a trade on June 26, 2010 that sent a sixth-round pick (158th overall) to Los Angeles in exchange for a sixth-round pick (169th overall) and this pick.
 The Pittsburgh Penguins' seventh-round pick went to the San Jose Sharks as the result of a trade on June 26, 2010 that sent a seventh-round pick in 2011 to Pittsburgh in exchange for this pick.
 The Phoenix Coyotes' seventh-round pick went to the Edmonton Oilers as the result of a trade on June 26, 2010 that sent a sixth-round pick in 2011 to Toronto in exchange for this pick.
Toronto previously acquired the pick as the result of a trade on March 3, 2010 that sent Lee Stempniak to Phoenix in exchange for Matt Jones, the Coyotes' fourth-round pick in 2010, and this pick.
 The Washington Capitals' seventh-round pick went to the Philadelphia Flyers as the result of a trade on June 26, 2010 that sent Jon Matsumoto to Carolina in exchange for this pick.
Carolina previously acquired the pick as the result of a trade on March 3, 2010 that sent Scott Walker to Washington in exchange for this pick.
 The San Jose Sharks' seventh-round pick went to the Buffalo Sabres as the result of a trade on July 4, 2008 that sent second-round picks in 2009 and 2010 to San Jose in exchange for Craig Rivet and this pick.
 The Chicago Blackhawks' seventh-round pick went to the Boston Bruins as the result of a trade on June 26, 2010 that sent a seventh-round pick in 2011 to Chicago in exchange for this pick.

Draftees based on nationality

North American draftees by state/province

See also
 2008–09 NHL transactions
 2009–10 NHL transactions
 2010–11 NHL season
 List of NHL first overall draft choices
 List of NHL players

References

External links

2010 NHL Entry Draft player stats at The Internet Hockey Database

2010
2010 in sports in California
Draft
2010 in Los Angeles
National Hockey League in Greater Los Angeles